Nadezhda Levchenko is a Soviet sprint canoeist who competed in the late 1960s. She won a gold medal in the K-4 500 m event at the 1966 ICF Canoe Sprint World Championships in East Berlin.

References

Living people
Soviet female canoeists
Year of birth missing (living people)
ICF Canoe Sprint World Championships medalists in kayak